Paranelima is a genus of harvestmen in the family Sclerosomatidae from Mexico and Central America.

Species
 Paranelima albalineata C.J.Goodnight & M.L.Goodnight, 1942
 Paranelima cerrana C.J.Goodnight & M.L.Goodnight, 1942
 Paranelima correa C.J.Goodnight & M.L.Goodnight, 1945
 Paranelima lutzi (C.J.Goodnight & M.L.Goodnight, 1942)
 Paranelima mexicanus (C.J.Goodnight & M.L.Goodnight, 1942)
 Paranelima taibeli Caporiacco, 1938

References

Harvestmen
Harvestman genera